Webster Lake is a  water body in West Franklin, a village of Franklin in Merrimack County in the central portion of the U.S. state of New Hampshire. Water from Webster Lake flows to the Pemigewasset River shortly above its confluence with the Winnipesaukee River to form the Merrimack.

Webster Lake has two public beaches operated by the city of Franklin, one on either side of the lake. Webster Lake is surrounded by forests, and roads follow most of the lakeshore, allowing frequent views. There is boating access adjacent to Lagace Beach on New Hampshire Route 11.

The lake is classified as a warmwater fishery, with observed species including rainbow trout, brown trout, smallmouth and largemouth bass, chain pickerel, horned pout, and white perch.

See also

List of lakes in New Hampshire

References

Lakes of Merrimack County, New Hampshire